Gorillaz is the debut studio album by English virtual band Gorillaz, released on 26 March 2001 in the United Kingdom by Parlophone and in the United States by Virgin Records. The album reached number three in the UK and number fourteen in the US, and the top ten in several other countries. Gorillaz has sold over seven million copies worldwide. The album's success earned the group an entry in the Guinness Book of World Records as the "Most Successful Virtual Band", and spawned the singles "Clint Eastwood", "19-2000", "Rock the House", and "Tomorrow Comes Today".

Background

Musician Damon Albarn and comic book creator Jamie Hewlett met in 1990 when guitarist Graham Coxon, a fan of Hewlett's work, asked him to interview Blur, a band Albarn and Coxon had recently formed. The interview was published in Deadline magazine, home of Hewlett's comic strip, Tank Girl. Hewlett initially thought Albarn was "arsey, a wanker"; despite becoming acquaintances with the band, they often did not get on, especially after Hewlett began seeing Coxon's ex-girlfriend Jane Olliver. Despite this, Albarn and Hewlett started sharing a flat on Westbourne Grove in London in 1997. Hewlett had recently broken up with Olliver and Albarn was at the end of his highly publicised relationship with Justine Frischmann of Elastica.

The idea to create Gorillaz came about when Albarn and Hewlett were watching MTV. Hewlett said, "If you watch MTV for too long, it's a bit like hell – there's nothing of substance there. So we got this idea for a cartoon band, something that would be a comment on that." The band originally identified themselves as "Gorilla" and the first song they recorded was "Ghost Train" which was later released as a B-side on their single "Rock the House" and the B-side compilation G-Sides. The musicians behind Gorillaz' first incarnation included Albarn, Del the Funky Homosapien, Dan the Automator and Kid Koala, who had previously worked together on the track "Time Keeps on Slipping" for Deltron 3030's eponymous debut album.

Although not released under the Gorillaz name, Albarn has said that "one of the first ever Gorillaz tunes" was Blur's 1997 single "On Your Own", which was released for their fifth studio album Blur.

20th anniversary reissue
In March 2021, to celebrate the 20th anniversary of the album's release, a vinyl box set was announced. The first edition of the boxset, which was exclusive to the band's webstore, was released on 10 December 2021. The boxset includes previously released material, including the original album, the B-sides compilation album G-Sides, and the remix album Laika Come Home (which received its first reissue since its initial press) and previously unreleased material, including live performances from the 2001 London Forum concert and five demos. Additionally, it also includes notes and early sketches by Jamie Hewlett during the making of the album. Later editions will also be released in 2022.

Composition
Critics have described the album as alternative rock, lo-fi, dub, hip hop, trip hop, and art pop, with elements of punk rock, rap rock, art rock, Britpop, Latin, and bubblegum pop.
The album's first single "Clint Eastwood", is named after the famous movie actor. The theme from The Good, The Bad, and the Ugly can be heard periodically throughout the song; this was one of several Sergio Leone-directed Italian westerns of the late 1960s in which Eastwood plays a character with no name. Years after the release of this album, it was revealed that the track "Starshine" has an alternative version, which features Luton-based rap group Phi Life Cypher. This version is not available on any releases, but it is available on the Phi Life Cypher SoundCloud channel and also on the video-sharing website YouTube.

All editions of the Gorillaz album feature an enhanced section that included screen savers, wallpaper and an autoplay, featuring a short movie which opens the user's Internet browser to a special section of the Gorillaz website, which gives the user full access to Murdoc's Winnebago.

Del the Funky Homosapien collaborated on two songs on the album, "Clint Eastwood" and "Rock the House", both of which became singles and videos and achieved chart success. Del was not originally slated to collaborate on these songs. By the time Del came onto the project, the album was already finished, and Phi Life Cypher had recorded verses for "Clint Eastwood"; but when Del finished making Deltron 3030 with Dan the Automator, Automator asked if he could stay in the studio a little longer to record new verses for the Gorillaz songs. For the purposes of the music videos and the Gorillaz storyline canon, Del performed as Gorillaz character "Del the Ghost Rapper", who was said to be a spirit that was hiding from death within the band's drummer, Russel Hobbs. Del later commented in an interview on the success of "Clint Eastwood" by saying that he actually wrote his rap for the song using the book How to Write a Hit Song, a book that he bought with a coupon his mother gave him. After the song went platinum he gave the plaque to his mother. As part of Russel Hobbs' back-story, the character of Del was one of Russel's friends that was gunned down in a drive-by shooting, whose ghost possessed Russel.

In 2004, the album was packaged with 2002's Laika Come Home in a limited edition box set as part of EMI's "2CD Originals" collection. Other saw a release such as the reggae-dub  "Dub Dumb", which features British-Jamaican artist Sweetie Irie; it is available on the PlayStation 2 game MTV Music Generator 2 rather than on G-Sides or the album itself. Other tracks include "Gor Beaten", which was another track that didn't make the album; however, elements of the track's instrumental were once available on one of the Gorillaz member's computers in Kong Studios.

Reception

Gorillaz received generally positive reviews from critics. It was ranked sixth in both Spin's and Kludge's end-of-year lists, 48 on NME's 2001 year-end list and Q ranked it among the 50 best albums of the year. The album was nominated for the 2001 Mercury Music Prize (Gorillaz was bookmakers' favourite before the nomination was withdrawn at the band's request).

The album made some retrospective "best of" lists. Slant Magazine ranked the album no. 96 in its best of the 2000s, Complex, Consequence Of Sound and Rhapsody ranked it among the top 100 albums of the 2000s and Gigwise included it in its 2013 best self-titled albums of all time. The album was given an entry in the book 1001 Albums You Must Hear Before You Die.

Singles
 "Tomorrow Comes Today" was released as an EP before the album was released. A video for the single was also released.
 "Clint Eastwood" was the first single from the album, debuting on 4 March 2001. The single peaked at number four on the UK Singles Chart, number 57 on the Billboard Hot 100 and number three on the Billboard Hot Modern Rock Tracks chart.
 "19-2000" was the second single from the album, released in June 2001. The single peaked at number six on the UK Singles Chart and number 23 on the Billboard Hot Modern Rock Tracks.
 "Rock the House" was the third single from the album, released in October 2001. The single peaked at number 18 on the UK Singles Chart.
 "Tomorrow Comes Today" was the fourth and final single from the album, released almost a year after the album, in February 2002. It peaked at number 33 on the UK Singles Chart.
 "5/4" was repeatedly considered for a single but was edged out by "19-2000" and "Rock the House". A video was considered for this, but never got past the storyboarding stage.

Track listing
All songs are written by Damon Albarn, except where noted.

Sample credits

 "New Genious (Brother)" contains samples of "Hit or Miss", written by Odetta Gordon and performed by Bo Diddley.
 "Man Research (Clapper)" contains samples of "In the Hall of the Mountain Queen" written and performed by Raymond Scott. 
 "Rock the House" contains samples of "Modesty Blaise", written and performed by John Dankworth.
 "Slow Country" contains samples of "Ghost Town" written by Jerry Dammers and performed by The Specials.
 "M1 A1" contains samples of music from the film Day of the Dead, written by John Harrison.

Personnel
Credits adapted from the liner notes of Gorillaz.

Musicians
 Damon Albarn – vocals, keyboards, piano, melodica, guitars, bass guitar , drum programming, flute (10)
 Junior Dan – bass guitar 
 Jason Cox – drums, drum programming
 Dan the Automator – sampled loops, drum programming (2, 8, 12–13), additional synthesizers
 Tom Girling – drum programming
 Kid Koala – turntables
 Miho Hatori – additional vocals 
 Del the Funky Homosapien – vocals 
 Dave Rowntree – drums 
 Tina Weymouth – additional vocals, additional percussion 
 Chris Frantz – additional percussion 
 Ibrahim Ferrer – vocals 
 Cass Browne – drums 
Mike Smith – trumpet (12), saxophone ("Dracula")

Technical
 Gorillaz – production
 Jason Cox – engineering, production
 Dan Nakamura – co-production 
 Tom Girling – engineering, Pro Tools, co-production
 Toby Whelan – engineering assistance
 Howie Weinberg – mastering

Artwork
 Jamie Hewlett – artwork
 Zombie Flesh Eaters – artwork
 Jow – photography
 Ed Reeve – photography

Charts

Weekly charts

Year-end charts

Certifications

Release history

Notes

References

Bibliography

External links
 

2001 debut albums
Albums produced by Damon Albarn
Albums produced by Dan the Automator
Albums recorded at Studio 13
Virgin Records albums
Warner Records albums
Gorillaz albums
Parlophone albums